The 2019 German Masters (officially the 2019 D88.com German Masters) was a professional ranking snooker tournament, taking place from 30 January to 3 February 2019 in Berlin, Germany. The tournament was the eleventh ranking event of the 2018/2019 season.

The event was won by Kyren Wilson, who won his third career ranking event, defeating David Gilbert in the final 9–7.

Mark Williams was the defending champion, but he lost 5–0 to Kyren Wilson in the quarter-finals.

Judd Trump made his fourth career maximum break, in the second qualifying round of the event, in his 5–0 win over Lukas Kleckers. David Gilbert made the main event's highest break; with a break of 139.

Despite never previously reaching the last 16 of a ranking event, Duane Jones reached the semi-finals, defeating top 16 players Ding Junhui and Jack Lisowski.

Tournament Summary
Two rounds of qualifying took place between 18 and 21 December 2018 at the Barnsley Metrodome in Barnsley, England. The main event featured 32 players, held between 30 January and 3 February 2019 on four tables.

Prize fund
The breakdown of prize money for this year is shown below:

 Winner: £80,000
 Runner-up: £35,000
 Semi-final: £20,000
 Quarter-final: £10,000
 Last 16: £5,000
 Last 32: £4,000
 Last 64: £3,000

 Highest break: £1,500
 Total: £396,500

The "rolling 147 prize" for a maximum break: £5,000

Main draw

Final

Qualifying
Two rounds of qualifying matches took place between 18 and 21 December 2018 at the Barnsley Metrodome in Barnsley, England. All matches were best of 9 frames.

Round 1

Round 2

Century breaks

Main stage centuries
Total: 28

 139, 120, 105  David Gilbert
 138, 129  Duane Jones
 137  Fergal O'Brien
 135  Matthew Stevens
 130  Stuart Bingham
 128  Ding Junhui
 127, 126, 120, 106  Mark Selby
 127  Mark Williams
 118  Stephen Maguire
 117  Kyren Wilson
 113  Judd Trump
 113  Yan Bingtao
 110, 104  Neil Robertson
 110  Jack Lisowski
 110  Rory McLeod
 109  Peter Ebdon
 105, 102, 102  Xiao Guodong
 105  Li Hang
 104  Barry Hawkins

Qualifying stage centuries 
Total: 80

 147, 137, 114  Judd Trump
 145, 110  Jack Lisowski
 143, 118  Barry Hawkins
 137, 136, 131, 129, 124, 105, 103  Shaun Murphy
 137  Li Hang
 136, 119, 115, 111  Matthew Stevens
 136  Chris Wakelin
 136  Zhou Yuelong
 135, 119, 106, 103  Mark Williams
 135, 118, 102  Neil Robertson
 135  Sam Craigie
 135  Anthony McGill
 134  Dominic Dale
 133, 101  David Gilbert
 132, 130  Graeme Dott
 132  Ashley Carty
 129  John Higgins
 128  Tom Ford
 127, 108  Duane Jones
 127  Jak Jones
 125, 116  Lu Ning
 125  Stuart Bingham
 121  Chen Feilong
 120  Gary Wilson
 119, 107  Liang Wenbo
 117, 111, 100  Robert Milkins
 116, 102  Ricky Walden
 115, 104  Joe Perry
 112  Craig Steadman
 111  Fergal O'Brien
 109  Jordan Brown
 109  Yuan Sijun
 107  Stephen Maguire
 105  Rory McLeod
 104, 101  Ding Junhui
 104  Stuart Carrington
 104  Zhang Anda
 103  Mei Xiwen
 103  Matthew Selt
 103  Robbie Williams
 103  Xiao Guodong
 102  Mark King
 101, 100  Peter Ebdon
 101  Eden Sharav
 101  Lee Walker
 101  Yan Bingtao
 100, 100  Mark Selby
 100  Marco Fu
 100  Gerard Greene
 100  Kurt Maflin

References

2019
2019 in snooker
Masters
German Masters
German Masters
Sports competitions in Berlin